Benjamin Hinterstocker (born November 26, 1979) is a German ice hockey coach.

He coached the German national team at the 2015 IIHF Women's World Championship.

References

External links

1979 births
Living people
German ice hockey coaches
Ice hockey people from Berlin
HC TWK Innsbruck players
Kassel Huskies players
Eisbären Berlin players
Kölner Haie players
Füchse Duisburg players
SC Bietigheim-Bissingen players
Essen Mosquitoes players
Hamburg Freezers players
German expatriate ice hockey people
German expatriate sportspeople in Austria
German ice hockey forwards